Heroes Shed No Tears is a 1980 Hong Kong wuxia film directed by Chor Yuen and produced by the Shaw Brothers Studio, starring Alexander Fu and Derek Yee. It is adapted from the novel Ying Xiong Wu Lei by Gu Long.

Plot
Kao Chien Fei (Alexander Fu Sheng) is a young swordsman who wields a special sword with a teardrop forged into its blade. Chien Fei is charged with averting an impending crisis in the martial arts world, but the villain, Zhou Tung Lai (Derek Yee Tung-Sing), wishes to become the ruler of the world of martial arts, and launches a scheme to pit the various heroes against one another.

Cast
Alexander Fu as Kao Chien-fei
Derek Yee as Zhou Tung-lai
Ku Feng as Chu Meng
Jason Pai as Sze-ma Chao-chun
Ku Kuan-chung as Tsai Chung
Yueh Hua as Hsiao Lei-hsueh
Angie Chiu as Graceful
Lau Wai-ling as Sze-ma's wife
Wang Sha as Hsiao Kong-tsi, Zhou's master
Cheng Miu as Kao Chien-fei's master
Keung Hon as Yang Chian
Yuen Wah as Mu Chi, killer
Yuen Bun as Han Chang, killer
Austin Wai as Sun Tong, head of guards
Lam Fai-wong as Nailed Shoe
Jamie Luk as Bull
Yeung Chi-hing as Ah-gen
Wong Ching-ho as Blind beggar
Wong Chi-ming as Shenlao
Kong Chuen as Chu Meng's killer
Ng Yuen-fan as Chu Meng's killer
Lee Hang as Chu Meng's killer
Tam Bo as Chu Meng's man
Ling Chi-hung as Chu Meng's man
Fei Gin as Chu Meng's man
Tam Wai-man as Chu Meng's man
Cheung Chok-chow as teahouse customer
Fung Ming as tavern customer
Leung Sam as tavern customer
Fong Yue as enrollment ceremony guest
Lee Wan-miu as enrollment ceremony guest
Gam Tin-chue as townsfolk
Lo Wai
Jue Gong
Siu Tak-foo
Wong Kung-miu

External links

1980 films
Hong Kong martial arts films
Shaw Brothers Studio films
Wuxia films
Films directed by Chor Yuen
Films based on works by Gu Long
1980s Hong Kong films